Kenny Neal (born October 14, 1957), is an American blues guitar player, singer and band member. 

Neal was born in New Orleans, Louisiana, the son of Raful Neal, and he comes from a musical family. He has often performed with his brothers in his band.

Career
Neal preserves the blues sound of his native south Louisiana, as befits someone who learned from Slim Harpo, Buddy Guy, and his father, harmonica player Raful Neal.

In 1987, Neal cut his debut album for the Florida record producer Bob Greenlee — an updated swamp feast initially marketed on King Snake Records as Bio on the Bayou. Alligator Records picked it up the following year, retitling it Big News from Baton Rouge!!

In 1991, he proved to be a talented actor in the Broadway production of the folk musical Mule Bone (by Langston Hughes and Zora Neale Hurston), singing numbers written by Taj Mahal.

Neal has played with blues stars including Lucky Peterson and Lazy Lester, and was at one time a member of The Downchild Blues Band, during a period of relocation to Toronto, Ontario, Canada.

In September 2006, Neal announced he was taking a year's break from recording and performing, due to an undisclosed illness. He returned to the public eye at the Monterey Blues Festival in June 2007.  He has children named Kenny, Syreeta, and Micah.

In 2010, he was touring with the Efes Pilsen Blues Festival.

In 2016, Neal's album Bloodline received a Grammy Award nomination for Best Contemporary Blues Album. Neal recorded Bloodline in Nashville, Los Angeles and Baton Rouge. He co-produced it with Buddy Guy’s Grammy-winning producer, Tom Hambridge.

Awards

Honors
 2011 - Inducted into the Louisiana Music Hall of Fame
 2005 - Official Statement to Kenny Neal, by the Governor of Louisiana
 1993 - Washington, D.C., USIA Certificate of Appreciation for representing the U.S. with Kenny Neal's Blues Band for tour in Africa

Winner
 2019 - Blues Music Award for Contemporary Blues Male Artist of the Year 
 2011 - Jus' Blues Music Foundation Contemporary/Traditional Blues Song Of The Year for "Hooked on Your Love"
 2011 - Critic's Poll Living Blues Award for Best Contemporary Blues Album of the Year
 2009 - Monterey Bay Blues (M.O.B.B.A.Y.) Artist of the Year Award
 2009 - Blues Music Award winner for Song of the Year, "Let Life Flow"
 2009 - West Coast Blues Hall of Fame Awards for Blues CD of the Year "Let Life Flow" and Blues Band of the Year
 2009 - Blueswax Album of the Year "Let Life Flow"
 2008 - Blues Critic Awards Readers Poll, Blues Album of the Year "Let Life Flow" and also Contemporary Blues Artist of the Year
 2008 - Jus' Blues Awards "Junior Wells Harp Award"
 2008 - Hometown Video Awards, Entertainment Talk Show
 2007 - W.A.V.E. Award, Talk Show-Entertainment/Pro
 2005 - W.C. Handy Blues Awards - Acoustic Blues Album
 2003 - Slim Harpo Award in Baton Rouge
 1994 - Theatre World Award "Outstanding New Talent" on Broadway
 1989 - Big Bill Broonzy Award in Paris
 1989 - JD Miller Award "Outstanding Performance"

Nominated
 2016 - Grammy Nomination for Bloodline - "Best Contemporary Blues Album"
 2009 - Grammy nominations in four categories
 1999 - Grammy Nomination for Tribute to Howlin' Wolf - "Best Traditional Blues Album"

See also
List of blues musicians
Long Beach Blues Festival
San Francisco Blues Festival

References

External links
 kennyneal.net Official Home Page NB: serves toxic web page
 
 

1957 births
Living people
Blues musicians from New Orleans
American blues guitarists
American male guitarists
American blues singers
American male singers
Swamp blues musicians
Singers from Louisiana
Guitarists from Louisiana
20th-century American guitarists
20th-century American male musicians
Blind Pig Records artists
Cleopatra Records artists